Norkus is a Lithuanian language family name.  This surname originates from a derivative of noras ‘wish’, ‘desire’, ‘will’ or noréti ‘to want’.

It may refer to:
Caleb Norkus, an American soccer player
Herbert Norkus, a Nazi martyr, a Hitler Youth member murdered by German Communists
Vytautas Norkus, a 1939 Lithuania national basketball team player
Ruta Norkiene, a Lithuanian female curler
Charley Norkus (N.C. State College football player, running back):  (c) 1920's
Charley Norkus, professional boxer:  (c) 1950's

References

Lithuanian-language surnames